This is a list of some onshore wind farms (more than 1 turbine) in the UK. This information is gathered from multiple Internet sources, primarily the UK Wind Energy Database from RenewableUK (formerly BWEA) and The Wind Power's database. The name of the wind farm is the name used by the energy company when referring to the farm and is usually related to the name of the physical location, e.g. hill, moor, fell, down etc. or the name of the agricultural farm for the smaller installations on property owned by farmers. The "wind farm" part is implied and hence removed for clarity in most cases. Listings here are restricted to wind farms with 12 turbines or more; for a more comprehensive list, please see the individual country articles.

England

Northern Ireland

Scotland

Wales

See also

List of offshore wind farms in the United Kingdom
Renewable energy in the United Kingdom
Wind power in the United Kingdom
David Howe's irrational fear of wind turbines

References

Wind
United Kingdom